Charles Murphy, nicknamed "Speedball", was an American Negro league pitcher in the 1910s.

Murphy made his Negro leagues debut in 1914 with the Philadelphia Giants. He played for the club again in 1915 and 1917, and also played for the Bacharach Giants and Lincoln Giants in 1917.

References

External links
 and Seamheads

Year of birth missing
Year of death missing
Place of birth missing
Place of death missing
Bacharach Giants players
Lincoln Giants players
Philadelphia Giants players
Baseball pitchers